Simon Ross Mensing (born 27 June 1982) is a German-born English professional footballer who plays as a centre back.

During his career Mensing has played for 10 different clubs, including spells with Wimbledon in England; Stenhousemuir, Clyde, St Johnstone, Motherwell, Hamilton Academical, Greenock Morton, Raith Rovers, Livingston and Airdrieonians in Scotland; and Atlanta Silverbacks and Carolina RailHawks in America.

Club career

Clyde
In 2001, Mensing joined Clyde on loan from Wimbledon. He quickly became a regular in his right back role, and won the Young Player of the Year award in his first season. He joined Clyde permanently in May 2002. Mensing became a huge fans favourite, with his aggressive style of play and was given the nickname "Gunter" due to his German roots. His versatility was also an important feature of his game, playing in every defensive role, as well as midfield on several occasions, and occasionally as a striker.

St Johnstone
Mensing scored the only goal of the game in St Johnstone's win at Queen of the South in the second league game of the 2006–07 season. On 28 February 2007, Mensing was named as the BBC's Man of the Match in St Johnstone's televised 2–1 Scottish Cup win at Motherwell, a result which took the Perth club into their second cup semi-final of the season.

Hamilton Academical
Mensing moved from Motherwell to local rivals Hamilton Academical on a three-month loan deal in September 2007, after finding it difficult to progress beyond being a squad player. After extending the deal for an additional month Hamilton then signed Mensing permanently on 18 January 2008. He won promotion to the Scottish Premier League with the Accies in 2007–08 as Division One champions. Mensing was banned for a month in 2011 for testing for a banned substance methylhexaneamine. The positive urine test was taken after the game against Aberdeen on 29 December. He missed five games for Hamilton in total. Mensing revealed that the substance was in a dietary supplement he had been taking purchased of the high street and he had taken advice before taking and believed there to be no banned substances in it. Hamilton and Mensing only revealed details of the ban after it had been served. He was banned between 29 January and 28 February 2011. Despite the ban, Mensing maintain his innocent for testing for a banned substance methylhexaneamine. Mensing left Hamilton after season 2011–12 after spending five years at the club.

Raith Rovers
After being released by Hamilton Academical, Mensing went on trial with Morton for most of the summer 2012 pre-season, and played as a trialist in a 1–1 draw with his former club Hamilton. On 14 September 2012, Mensing signed for Raith Rovers on a one-year contract despite Hamilton offering him a new contract. On his debut against Airdrie United, he got the man of the match award and his performance was praised by manager Grant Murray. Mensing scored his first goal for Raith Rovers in a 4–4 draw with Fife neighbours Cowdenbeath.

Livingston
On 22 May 2013, Mensing signed for Livingston on a two-year contract. He was named captain of his new club on 10 July 2013, and scored a penalty on his competitive debut on 3 August 2013 in a Scottish Challenge Cup match against Berwick Rangers.

USA Soccer
On 27 January 2015, Coach Gary Smith bolstered the Atlanta backline with the signings of Mensing and fellow Englishman Paul Black. However he left the club in January 2016 due to the side folding after failing to find local ownership. Returning to Scotland, Mensing trained with Scottish League One side Dunfermline Athletic with a view to signing for the Pars who were suffering an injury crisis, with four defenders out through injury.

However, Mensing opted to stay in America and signed with Carolina RailHawks of the North American Soccer League on 22 January 2016.

Return to Scotland
After leaving Carolina RailHawks, Mensing signed for Scottish League One club Airdrieonians on 27 January 2017, in a deal until the end of the 2016–17 season. After 17 appearances for the club, Mensing was released in May 2017, signing for fellow League One club Forfar Athletic shortly after.

Coaching career
Mensing began his coaching career as a youth coach at Partick Thistle in January 2019.

Career statistics

Honours
Clyde
Scottish First Division: (Runners-up) (2): 2002–03, 2003–04

Hamilton Academical
Scottish First Division: 2007–08
Scottish Challenge Cup: (Runners-up): 2011–12

References

External links
 
 

1982 births
Living people
People from Wolfenbüttel
English footballers
Association football midfielders
Wimbledon F.C. players
Greenock Morton F.C. players
Stenhousemuir F.C. players
Clyde F.C. players
St Johnstone F.C. players
Motherwell F.C. players
Hamilton Academical F.C. players
Raith Rovers F.C. players
Livingston F.C. players
Atlanta Silverbacks players
North Carolina FC players
Airdrieonians F.C. players
Forfar Athletic F.C. players
Scottish Premier League players
Scottish Football League players
Scottish Professional Football League players
North American Soccer League players
English expatriate sportspeople in the United States
English expatriate footballers
Footballers from Lower Saxony